The Territorial Prelature of Isabela (de Basilan) is a Roman Catholic territorial prelature located in the province of Basilan, and its component cities of Isabela City and Lamitan City, in the Ecclesiastical province of Zamboanga in the Philippines.

History

The Prelature of Isabela in Basilan was established on October 12, 1963, and comprises the whole of Basilan Province, including Isabela City, its former capital, and Lamitan City, the new capital. Bishop Jose Ma. Querexeta, CMF, was the first bishop−prelate of Isabela. During his term, he established parishes for the Catholics as well as schools for both Muslims and Christians.

The Mindanao War in the 1970s shattered the prelature's dream of Christians and Muslims living peacefully side by side.  This was aggravated by the kidnapping of a Spanish Claretian priest in 1987 who had devoted many years of his priestly life in Basilan attending to the spiritual needs of Christians and the economic needs of the poorer Muslims.

Bishop Romulo dela Cruz became the Prelate Ordinary of Basilan in 1989 upon the retirement of Bishop Querexeta.  It was during Dela Cruz′s term as a bishop when Islamic Fundamentalism was on the rise and the Abu Sayyaf, a violent fundamentalist group of armed adherents, came into existence.

One Franciscan brother and one Claretian priest were kidnapped in 1992 and 1993 respectively.  Not even the local clergy was spared.

Father Cirilo Nacorda was kidnapped on June 8, 1994, and was released three months later, but not before fifteen of his companions were killed and the remaining 25 captives, mostly teachers and health workers, were finally released.

Kidnapping remains a genuine threat for church workers and priests in Basilan.  But admirably, not a single one of them, including the lay workers, are intimidated by it, or retreat because of fear.  The prelature personnel, from the lay workers up to the bishop himself, are one in standing firm on no ransom for kidnapping.

Perhaps because of the semblance of "persecution" of Christians, who are very often the victims of the present instability in Basilan, there is also perceived a unity and solidarity among them.  Lay people are exceptionally and spiritually alive, and are always willing to work and get involved.

The impending establishment of a Provisional Government in Mindanao under the Moro National Liberation Front (MNLF) hangs like a sword of Damocles over Basilan Christians who have no wish to be part of the Provisional Government.

Vision and Mission of the Prelature

For its vision, the church in Basilan hopes to proclaim a Christian understanding of the human person, of society, and the common good of all the people of Basilan, considering its divergent cultures, religions and ideologies.

For its mission it aims to promote a "new spirituality" that  unites people in faith and in the Lord, in justice and charity towards  neighbor, in a personal conversion that could bring about a change in societal structures.  It is the perception of the church in Basilan that the renewal of a vision and a mission, as initiated by the Plenary Council of the Philippines II, is not entirely new for Basilan Christians because of their minority situation.  Rather it is a question of deepening this renewal in order to strengthen one's own evangelization, to be able to pass this on to one's neighbor, be he Muslim or Christian.

Prelates of Isabela

References
 GCatholic.org
 Catholic Hierarchy
 Prelature website 

Roman Catholic dioceses in the Philippines
Roman Catholic Ecclesiastical Province of Zamboanga
Isabela, Basilan
Christian organizations established in 1963
Roman Catholic dioceses and prelatures established in the 20th century
Territorial prelatures